The Lambert Automobile Company developed as a  automobile factory in Anderson, Indiana. It manufactured the Lambert automobile, truck, fire engine and farm tractor as a part of the governing Buckeye Manufacturing Company. Lambert manufactured vehicles from 1905 to 1915. In 1910 the company had over a thousand employees, and from 1910 to 1915 the production had reached about three thousand vehicles per year. It went out of business in 1917 because of World War I.

The company materialized as a result of vehicle innovations conceived by inventor John William Lambert. It specialized in making a unique automobile called the Lambert, the main feature of which was a gearless transmission. The company also manufactured a farm tractor that would convert into a hauling truck or farm implement machine.

History
The Lambert Automobile Company materialized as the second factory plant for the Union Automobile Company of Union City, Indiana.
Automotive pioneer John William Lambert started the Union factory plant that was built in Anderson, Indiana, in 1904, and it had  of factory floor space. Lambert changed the name officially in 1905 to the Lambert Automobile Company and the Union Automobile Company name was dropped. A technologically advanced automobile was then manufactured from the Union automobile design. 

The Lambert Automobile Company based in Anderson was managed by Lambert's father George A. Lambert. The company manufactured the Lambert automobile and other vehicles under the supervision of the Buckeye Manufacturing Company which had several subsidiaries. Eleven years after 1905 the company manufactured not only automobiles but trucks, fire engines and farm tractors.

Lambert automobile 
The Lambert automobile was the signature product of the company. One of its main features was Lambert's invention of the friction gearless disk drive transmission. The company always made their own bodies, but it sometimes had the engines manufactured by independent motor builders like Buda Engine Company, Rutenber Motor Company, Continental Motors Company, Trebert Gas Engine Company, and Davis Motor Car Company. Theses motors were always constructed to Lambert's specifications. The upholstery used on the interiors was of the best quality obtainable and the final metal body was painted with several coats.

In 1906 Lambert made the inaugural "Lambert" automobile. With this line Lambert established himself as a prosperous automobile manufacturer of that time period. Most of his automobiles were chain-driven rather than shaft driven. Production of automobiles and trucks had reached two thousand vehicles per year from 1906 to 1910. In 1910 the company had over a thousand employees. They manufactured around three thousand vehicles per year for the next five years.

Lambert Steel Hoof Tractor 

The Lambert Steel Hoof Tractor was introduced to the farm industry in 1912 as a product of the Lambert Automobile Company. It performed work that ten horses did before and could turn in an eleven foot circle. It was a three-wheeled or four-wheeled gasoline engine farm tractor equipped with solid rubber tires and steel wheels. It had a drive-wheel design with retractable pads. At this time B. F. Lambert, brother of John Lambert, was president of the Lambert Tractor Company, president of the Buckeye Manufacturing Company, and president of Lambert Gas and Gasoline Engine Company. John Lambert's other brother, A. L. Lambert, was also associated with these companies and was general sales manager of the Lambert Automobile Company. All these companies were working together in Anderson at the same time.

The Lambert Steel Hoof Tractor was sometimes referred to as an automobile tractor and one of its purposes was for the cultivating of fruit orchards. The hoof tractor received its name from wheels that had steel cleats which handled loose dirt much like the hoofs of a horse. The vehicle converted automatically from a farm tractor for cultivation into a hauling truck. With attachments it became an irrigation pump, sawmill, hay baler and crop cutter for making silage. An advertisement from 1913 said that in an orchard of the Leffingwell Rancho in Whittier, California, the Lambert farm tractor plowed a thirty acre lemon grove six inches deep in adobe soil. It did the preparation of the soil at the rate of two acres per hour and consumed fuel at less than a gallon of gasoline per acre while dragging 300 pounds of scrap iron.

Model X  Specifications 

Mechanical service  1020 horsepower 
Bore  4.5 inches
Stroke  5 inches
Tires Front  42 x 3 inches
Tires Rear  42 x 3.5 inches 
Frame  Channel steel 5 inches 
Rear Axle  Square forging 
Carburetor  Schebler 
Cooling System  Water with large centrifugal pump 
Ignition  Briggs dual 
Control  On top of steering post 
Transmission  Three speeds forward and three reverse 
Steering Gear  Double nut

Demise
When the United States entered into World War I the Lambert Automobile Company factory plant was converted by Buckeye Manufacturing Company to start making national defense products.  The company then made weapon products and military equipment. When the war ended in 1918 Lambert decided not to resume automobile production and only made parts for automobiles by means of the Buckeye Manufacturing Company. Lambert realized automobiles were only going to be made by large automobile manufactures. The Buckeye Manufacturing Company stopped manufacturing automobile parts permanently in 1922. There are four Lambert automobiles known to have survived that are held privately.

Notes

Sources

Further reading 
 Biography of John W. Lambert, written by his son January 25, 1935 — obtained from the Detroit Public Library, National Automotive History Collection
 Dolnar, Hugh, Automobile Trade Journal, article: The Lambert, 1906 Line of Automobiles, Chilton Company, v.10 January 1906
 Forkner, John L., History of Madison County, Indiana, New York and Chicago, The Lewis Publishing Company, 1914
 The Horseless Age: The Automobile Trade Magazine, The Horseless Age Company, 1902
 Bailey, L. Scott, Historic Discovery: 1891 Lambert, New Claim for America's First Car, Antique Automobile magazine, Vol. 24, No. 5, Oct–Nov 1960
 David Burgess Wise, The New Illustrated Encyclopedia of Automobiles 
 Dittlinger, Esther et al., Anderson: A Pictorial History, G. Bradley Publishing, 1990, 

 Huffman, Wallace Spencer, Indiana's Place in Automobile History in Indiana History Bulletin, vol 44, no. 2, Feb. 1967; Indianapolis, Indiana Historical Bureau
 Huhti, Thomas, The Great Indiana Touring Book: 20 Spectacular Auto Tours, Big Earth Publishing, 2002, 
 James, Wanda, Driving from Japan, McFarland, 2005, 
 Madden, W. C., Haynes-Apperson and America's First Practical Automobile: A History, McFarland, 2003, 
 Scharchburg, Richard P., Carriages Without Horses: J. Frank Duryea and the Birth of the American Automobile Industry, SAE, 1993, 

Defunct motor vehicle manufacturers of the United States
Motor vehicle manufacturers based in Indiana
Anderson, Indiana
Defunct companies based in Indiana
Vehicle manufacturing companies established in 1905
1905 establishments in Indiana
Vehicle manufacturing companies disestablished in 1916
1916 disestablishments in Indiana
1900s cars
1910s cars
Brass Era vehicles